Jean-Michel Portal (born 29 May 1970 in Paris) is a French actor, best known for his role in The Officers' Ward (2001), for which he was nominated for Most Promising Actor at the 27th César Awards.

References

Most Promising Actor César Award winners
Living people
1970 births
Male actors from Paris
French male film actors
French male television actors
French pop singers
20th-century French male actors
21st-century French male actors